The Roman Catholic Diocese of Bukoba is a diocese located in Bukoba in the Ecclesiastical province of Mwanza in Tanzania.

History
 13 December 1951: Established as Apostolic Vicariate of Lower Kagera from the Diocese of Bukoba
 25 March 1953: Promoted as Diocese of Rutabo 
 21 June 1960: Renamed as Diocese of Bukoba

Bishops
 Vicar Apostolic of Lower Kagera (Roman rite)
 Bishop Laurean Rugambwa (1951.12.13 – 1953.03.25); see below; future Cardinal
 Bishops of Rutabo (Roman rite)
 Bishop Laurean Rugambwa (1953.03.25 – 1960.06.21); see above & below (Cardinal in 1960)
 Bishops of Bukoba (Roman rite)
 Cardinal Laurean Rugambwa (1960.06.21 – 1968.12.19), appointed Archbishop of Dar-es-salaam; see above
 Bishop Placidus Gervasius Nkalanga, O.S.B. (1969.03.06 – 1973.11.26)
 Bishop Nestorius Timanywa (1973.11.26 - 2013.01.15)
 Bishop Desiderius M. Rwoma (2013.01.15 - present)

Auxiliary Bishops
Method Kilaini (2009-)
Placidus Gervasius Nkalanga, O.S.B. (1961-1969) appointed Bishop here

Other priests of this diocese who became bishops
Method Kilaini, appointed auxiliary bishop of Dar-es-Salaam in 1999; later returned here as Auxiliary Bishop
Novatus Rugambwa, appointed nuncio and titular archbishop in 2010
Almachius Vincent Rweyongeza, appointed Bishop of Kayanga in 2008
Desiderius M. Rwoma, appointed Bishop of Singida in 1999; later returned here as Bishop
Damian Kyaruzi. Bishop emeritus of Sumbawanga

See also
Roman Catholicism in Tanzania

Sources
 GCatholic.org
 Catholic Hierarchy

Bukoba
Christian organizations established in 1951
Bukoba
Roman Catholic dioceses and prelatures established in the 20th century
Bukoba, Roman Catholic Diocese of
1951 establishments in Tanganyika